Provincial Road 257 is a provincial road located in the far western region of Manitoba, Canada.

PR 257 starts at the Trans-Canada Highway just east of Virden and terminates at the Saskatchewan - Manitoba border between Kola and Maryfield, where it continues as Highway 48. The highway is known as Government Road South within Virden's town limits.

External links 
Manitoba Official Map - Southwest

257